"From Where You Are" is a song by the band Lifehouse that was written by Jason Wade for Allstate's Teen Driving Program and released as a promotional single in 2007. The song is dedicated to teens who have lost their lives in accidents and used to educate teens to drive safely. This song is also dedicated to a friend of Jason who died in a car accident at the age of 16.
The music video combines Jason Wade singing in a recording studio and clips from the Allstate commercial. The single was made available through the US iTunes Store on November 6, 2007. The song appeared on the episode "Weeks Go by Like Days" of One Tree Hill. Three years later, in 2010, a revised version of the song appeared on Smoke & Mirrors.

Charts

References

2007 singles
2007 songs
Lifehouse (band) songs
Songs written by Jason Wade
Geffen Records singles
Commemoration songs